Tadesse Gebregiorgis (born 29 March 1938) is an Ethiopian boxer. He competed at the 1964 Summer Olympics and the 1968 Summer Olympics. At the 1968 Summer Olympics, he lost to Expedito Alencar of Brazil.

References

1938 births
Living people
Ethiopian male boxers
Olympic boxers of Ethiopia
Boxers at the 1964 Summer Olympics
Boxers at the 1968 Summer Olympics
Sportspeople from Addis Ababa
Light-welterweight boxers
20th-century Ethiopian people